The field elm cultivar Ulmus minor 'Silvery Gem' is an ornamental clone raised, as Ulmus carpinifolia 'Silvery Gem', before 1965 by P. G. Zwijnenburg of Zwijnenburg nurseries, Boskoop, The Netherlands.

Description
The colouring and variegation are most striking in spring, fading somewhat in summer.

Pests and diseases
'Silvery Gem' is not known to be resistant to Dutch elm disease, but the low height of the tree may ensure that it avoids colonization by Scolytus bark beetles and thus remain free of infection. It has been noted that shrub-elms are usually less prone to infection.

Cultivation
The clone won a Golden Medal in The Netherlands in the mid-1960s. It remains available from several nurseries in Europe (see below).

Synonymy
Ulmus procera 'Silvery Gem'.

Nurseries

Europe
Arboretum Waasland , Nieuwkerken-Waas, Belgium.
Clonmel Garden Centre, Clonmel, Tipperary, Éire.
PlantenTuin Esveld, Boskoop, Netherlands. .
Wisley Plant Centre (Royal Horticultural Society), Woking, UK.

References

External links
 http://www.rhs.org.uk/RHSPlantFinder/Plantfinder2.asp?crit=ulmus&page=2&genus=Ulmus. RHS Plant Finder, UK.

Field elm cultivar
Ulmus articles missing images
Ulmus